Černík is a village and municipality in the Nové Zámky District in the Nitra Region of south-west Slovakia.

History
The village was first mentioned in historical records in 1156.

Geography
The municipality lies at an altitude of 129 metres and covers an area of 13.389 km². It has a population of about 990 people.

Ethnicity
The population is about 99% Slovak.

Facilities
The village has a small public library a gym and football pitch.

Genealogical resources

The records for genealogical research are available at the state archive "Statny Archiv in Nitra, Slovakia"

 Roman Catholic church records (births/marriages/deaths): 1709-1918 (parish B)
 Lutheran church records (births/marriages/deaths): 1785-1896 (parish B)

See also
 List of municipalities and towns in Slovakia

External links
 
 
http://www.statistics.sk/mosmis/eng/run.html
Surnames of living people in Cernik
Černík – Nové Zámky okolie

Villages and municipalities in Nové Zámky District